Hanahoe ("Group of One") was an unofficial private group and Secret society of military officers in South Korea headed by Chun Doo-hwan, who later became the South Korean president during the Fifth Republic era. The society established on Korea Military Academy and the members were mostly graduates of the eleventh class of the KMA in 1955. Hanahoe formed the core of the group that eventually took control of the presidency and government from Choi Kyu-hah, ending the Fourth Republic.

After its initial seizure of power on December 12, 1979, this private political organization maintained great influence in South Korean politics throughout the 1980s, but was later disbanded by force when Chun Doo-hwan and Roh Tae-Woo were put on trial in the middle of the 1990s soon after Kim Young-sam became president.

History
The Encyclopedia of Korean culture trace its origins in the private group Chilsonghoe (七星會, literally means group of seven stars) in 1958 that was formed by 7 people that included Roh, Chun and Junghoyong. The group was an expansion of the group Osunghoe (五星會), formed in  1951, which had five members-Roh, Chun, Kim Bok-dong, Choi Sung-taek, Park Byung-ha, and Chilsonghoe included two more members-Jung Ho-yong and Kwon Yik-hyon.

References 

Fourth Republic of Korea
Anti-communism in South Korea
Militarism
Military history of South Korea
Far-right politics in South Korea
Political organizations based in South Korea
Political history of South Korea
Chun Doo-hwan